Manson is an unincorporated hamlet in Manitoba, Canada.

It is located thirteen kilometers north of the Trans-Canada Highway along PTH 41 in the Rural Municipality of Ellice – Archie.

References 

Unincorporated communities in Westman Region